is a Japanese manga series written and illustrated by Mikoto Asou. It was serialized in Hakusensha's  manga magazine Melody from 2007 to August 28, 2018, with its chapters collected into 15  volumes.  was adapted into two Japanese television drama series: one in 2012 and another in 2014.

Characters
 
 Portrayed by: Yuika Motokariya
 
 Portrayed by: 
 
 Portrayed by: Megumi
 
 Portrayed by: Waka Inoue
 
 Portrayed by: Kohei Otomo

References

External links
 Official website for the TV series (defunct; link via the Wayback Machine) 
 

2007 manga
2012 Japanese television series debuts
2014 Japanese television series debuts
Hakusensha manga
Hakusensha franchises
Japanese television dramas based on manga
Josei manga